Sergei Belokon (born August 25, 1988) is a Russian professional ice hockey player who currently plays for Spartak Moscow of the Kontinental Hockey League (KHL).

References

External links

1988 births
Living people
Ice hockey people from Moscow
Russian ice hockey forwards
HC Vityaz players
Universiade medalists in ice hockey
Universiade gold medalists for Russia
Competitors at the 2011 Winter Universiade